The 1981 Cork Senior Hurling Championship was the 93rd staging of the Cork Senior Hurling Championship since its establishment by the Cork County Board in 1887. The championship began on 10 May 1981 and ended on 13 September 1981.

St. Finbarr's entered the championship as the defending champions.

The final was played on 13 September 1981 at Páirc Uí Chaoimh in Cork, between St. Finbarr's and Glen Rovers, in what was their second successive meeting in the final. St. Finbarr's won the match by 1-12 to 1-09 to claim their 21st championship title overall and a second successive title.

Christy Ryan was the championship's top scorer with 6-05.

Format change

At the County Convention on 25 January 1981, it was decided to end the three-year experiment of playing the championship on a league basis in the preliminary rounds and reverted to an open, seeded draw. The four semi-finalists from the 1980 championship (Midleton, Blackrock, St. Finbarr's and Glen Rovers) were the four seeded teams and were separated in the quarter-final stage.

Team changes

To Championship

Promoted from the Cork Intermediate Hurling Championship
 Ballyhea

Results

First round

Second round

Quarter-finals

Semi-finals

Final

Championship statistics

Top scorers

Top scorers overall

Miscellaneous

 After two postponements due to inclement weather, the Midleton-Carrigdhoun second round game was finally played on 21 June 1981. That game featured a 28-minute delay as a number of Carrigdhoun players were caught in heavy traffic in Cork.
 At a meeting on 30 June 1981, the Cork County Board ordered that the quarter-final between Glen Rovers and Youghal be replayed. Glen Rovers won the initial game, however, Youghal objected, alleging that one of the Glen players, Red Crowley, was under suspension on the date of the match. The board upheld the objection after an investigation.
 Charlie McCarthy became the first St. Finbarr's player to win six Cork SHC medals.

References

Cork Senior Hurling Championship
Cork Senior Hurling Championship